Cherkasovo is a rural locality (a village) in Pekshinskoye Rural Settlement, Petushinsky District, Vladimir Oblast, Russia. The population was 37 as of 2010.

Geography 
Cherkasovo is located on the left bank of the Peksha River, 23 km northeast of Petushki (the district's administrative centre) by road. Peksha is the nearest rural locality.

References 

Rural localities in Petushinsky District